Žagarė Manor is a former residence of Prince Platon Zubov in Žagarė, Joniškis district, in Lithuania. Manor reconstruction began in 2013.

References

Manor houses in Lithuania
Classicism architecture in Lithuania